Brewner Hollow (also called Bruner Hollow) is a valley in Morgan County, Missouri.

Brewner Hollow derives its name from the local Bruner family, who were the original owners of the site.

References

Valleys of Morgan County, Missouri
Valleys of Missouri